Querobamba is a town in Central Peru, capital of Sucre Province in Ayacucho Region.

Populated places in the Ayacucho Region